Morten Roald Petersen (born 27 May 1978) is a Danish retired football central defender who spent most of his career with Lyngby Boldklub. He has played several games for the Danish Under-21 and Under-19 national teams. 

Petersen began his professional career in Lyngby in 1994, but left the club following its bankruptcy in December 2001. Since then he has played for Livingston F.C. and AGF, before returning to Lyngby, whom he has captained since the spring of 2005.

References 
  DBU
  Lyngby Boldklub

1978 births
Living people
Danish men's footballers
Danish expatriate men's footballers
Danish Superliga players
Expatriate footballers in Scotland
Scottish Premier League players
Denmark under-21 international footballers
Livingston F.C. players
Aarhus Gymnastikforening players
Lyngby Boldklub players
Association football defenders
People from Gribskov Municipality
Sportspeople from the Capital Region of Denmark